Sergei Andreyevich Zuykov (born 19 September 1993) is a Russian football defender who plays for FC Rotor Volgograd.

Club career
He made his debut in the Russian Football National League for FC Volgar Astrakhan on 12 March 2013 in a game against FC Ural Sverdlovsk Oblast.

On 25 January 2019, he joined FC Tambov on loan.

References

External links
 
 

1993 births
People from Lyubertsy
Living people
Russian footballers
Russia youth international footballers
Russia under-21 international footballers
FC Volgar Astrakhan players
Association football defenders
FC Lokomotiv Moscow players
FC Tom Tomsk players
FC Tambov players
FC Nizhny Novgorod (2015) players
FC Zenit Saint Petersburg players
FC Zenit-2 Saint Petersburg players
FC Rotor Volgograd players
Sportspeople from Moscow Oblast